Uthai Thani is a town (thesaban mueang) in Thailand, capital of the Uthai Thani Province, in the upper central region of the country. It includes the entire tambon Uthai Mai of Mueang Uthai Thani district. The town is on the right bank of the Sakae Krang River, a few kilometers upstream from where it flows into the Chao Phraya. In 2008 it had a population of 16,787. It is approximately 200 km north-west of Bangkok.

Notable people
 
 
Tewa Promma (born 1988), Thai footballer

References

External links

 www.uthaicity.org 

Populated places in Uthai Thani province
Cities and towns in Thailand